Culture at 3, stylized as Culture @ 3, is a call with Cultural organizations in New York City that grew out of the city's shutdown due to the COVID-19 pandemic. It is believed to be the first time the arts and cultural organizations of all genres have come together to address issues facing the cultural community.

The call is led by the CIG Chair Taryn Sacramone with Sade Lythcott, CEO of the National Black Theatre and Lucy Sexton, Executive Director of New Yorkers for Culture & Arts (NY4CA). The call was daily at launch with some five hundred participating organizations, but shifted in frequency to meet the changing needs of participants as organizations began to reopen.

References

Cultural organizations based in New York (state)
COVID-19 pandemic in New York City